The Jarchi mosque was built according to a Thuluth inscription above its spandrel in 1610 under the supervision of Shah Abbas' herald. The word Jarchi means herald in Azeri and Persian. The mosque has a shabestan and is located in the Great Bazaar (Bazaar-e-Bozorg) of Isfahan. Decorations of this mosque are mainly destroyed.

See also
 Islam in Iran

References 

Mosques in Isfahan
17th-century mosques
1610 establishments in Iran
Mosques completed in 1610